David K. Littman (born June 13, 1967) is an American former ice hockey goaltender. He played three games in the National Hockey League: two with the Buffalo Sabres and one with the Tampa Bay Lightning between 1991 and 1993. The rest of his career, which lasted from 1989 to 2000, was mainly spent in the minor International Hockey League. He was drafted in the eleventh round, 211th overall, of the 1987 NHL Entry Draft by the Sabres. Internationally Littman played for the American national team at the 1994 World Championships.

Playing career

Collegiate
Littman spent four years at Boston College studying communications. In his senior year, Littman served as one of three captains on the team as the Eagles qualified for the NCAA final eight. He ended his season with .912 saves and a .895 percentage. In 2000, his BC record of 2,548 career saves was broken by Scott Clemmensen. As a result, he was selected for the AHCA East Second-Team All-American. He was drafted in the eleventh round, 211th overall, of the 1987 NHL Entry Draft by the Buffalo Sabres.

Professional
Littman attended the Sabres training camp but was reassigned to their International Hockey League (IHL) affiliate, the Rochester Americans, to begin the 1989–90 season. However, the 1990–91 would prove to be a breakout season for him. On January 29, 1991, Littman made his NHL debut by replacing Darcy Wakaluk in the second period. Littman saved 15 of 18 shots in an 8–3 loss to the St. Louis Blues. Upon their return to the IHL, both Littman and Wakaluk also set a new Rochester record for most points and assists by a goaltender with seven each. He was also selected for the 1991 All-Star Game. Littman shared the Harry "Hap" Holmes Memorial Award as the AHL's outstanding goaltender, with teammate Darcy Wakaluk.

The following year, he was again the recipient of the Harry "Hap" Holmes Memorial Award.

On August 28, 1992, Littman signed with the new NHL expansion team, the Tampa Bay Lightning. Although he began the season in the minor leagues with the Atlanta Knights, Littman was recalled to the NHL in November 1992. His stay in the National Hockey League was short-lived and he was reassigned to the IHL. He became a free agent at the end of the season.

As a result of his successful stints with the Atlanta Knights, Littman was selected to compete with Team USA at the 1994 IIHF World Championship, where they finished fourth in the tournament. Before his retirement, Littman played with the IHL's Orlando Solar Bears, recording 53 wins over two years before a career-ending knee injury.

Later life
After working for the Solar Bears as a color commentator, Littman joined EA Sports. He began as a quality assurance associate but later was promoted to producer on the NHL series of games.

Personal life
Littman was born in Queens, New York but grew up on Long Island. His family moved to Rhode Island prior to his acceptance to Boston College. Littman was raised Jewish.

Career statistics

Regular season and playoffs

International

Awards and honors

References

External links
 

1967 births
Living people
21st-century American Jews
AHCA Division I men's ice hockey All-Americans
American men's ice hockey goaltenders
Atlanta Knights players
Boston College Eagles men's ice hockey players
Buffalo Sabres draft picks
Buffalo Sabres players
Fredericton Canadiens players
Ice hockey players from Rhode Island
Jewish American sportspeople
Jewish ice hockey players
Long Beach Ice Dogs (IHL) players
Los Angeles Blades players
Orlando Solar Bears (IHL) players
Phoenix Roadrunners (IHL) players
Providence Bruins players
Richmond Renegades players
Rochester Americans players
San Antonio Dragons players
Sportspeople from Cranston, Rhode Island
Tampa Bay Lightning players